The 2004 TG4 All-Ireland Senior Ladies' Football Championship Final featured  and . Dublin started the stronger and led by six points after twenty five minutes thanks mainly to points from Angie McNally and Mary Nevin. However a Niamh Duggan goal and a point from Annette Clarke kept Galway in touch. At half-time Dublin led with the score at 0–7 to 1–2. In the second half, Galway took charge after  Clarke scored their second goal with an assist from Gillian Joyce. Nevin and McNally replied with further points for Dublin while Lisa Cohill and Gillian Joyce kept Galway ahead. Edel Concannon's goal eight minutes from time proved to be the decisive score that won the title for Galway.

Match info

Teams

References

!
All-Ireland Senior Ladies' Football Championship Finals
Galway county ladies' football team matches
Dublin county ladies' football team matches
All-Ireland